Carlia rubrigularis, the red-throated rainbow-skink or the northern red-throated skink is a species of skink in the genus Carlia. It is endemic to Queensland, Australia.

C. rubrigularis, provides an example of sexual dimorphism. Males display red throat coloration, while females exhibit pale pink. Throat coloration in males has been observed to become exaggerated during breeding season.

The reproduction period for female C. rubrigularis occurs from July-April.

References

Carlia
Reptiles described in 1989
Endemic fauna of Australia
Skinks of Australia
Taxa named by Glen Joseph Ingram
Taxa named by Jeanette Covacevich